Ramesh Prasad Mohapatra (1 October 1939 – 14 January 1989) was an archaeologist and scholar on Odia Studies. He served as curator for archaeology at the Odisha State Museum from 1963 to 1989 and made important contributions to historical research especially in the fields of archaeology, art history, religion, and other aspects of Odia cultural history.

Early life and education
Mohapatra was born in an orthodox Brahmin family with connections to the Royal family of Dhenkanal, something that greatly helped him in his later work on Military History of Odisha. He was the eldest son of Sitanath Paramguru, then the Zamindar of the village, and Moti Devi and married to Kusum Mohapatra.

Mohapatra received his master's degree in history from Ravenshaw College in Cuttack, India and obtained a diploma from the Delhi School of Archaeology of the Archaeological Survey of India, New Delhi. He obtained his PhD for his work on the Udayagiri and Khandagiri Caves from Utkal University, Bhubaneswar in 1976. His thesis outlines the importance of the twin caves of Udayagiri and Khandagiri in the development of Indian art and architecture, associated with the Kalinga emperor Kharavela. These caves represent the earliest examples of Jaina architecture in India. In 1979, Mohapatra obtained a DLitt from Utkal University for his work Jaina Monuments of Odisha, presenting a systematic study of Jaina monuments of Odisha.

Mohapatra was initiated to historical research by N. K. Sahu with whom he had worked in 1962 (Utkal University History of Odisha, vol I, 1964, preface). After joining the Odisha state museum as curator for archaeology, he took up research in field archaeology and Odia art under the guidance of K. C. Panigrahi.

Mohapatra's reference book Archaeology in Odisha published in two volumes, presents details of prehistoric and historical archaeology in the thirteen districts of Odisha. His collection of art-treasures, antiquities, and archaeological artefacts collected in the course of his field work is now in the Odisha State Museum.

Mohapatra served on many committees both nationally and internationally. He was nominated as a member of the Odisha Lalit Kala Akademi.

Books

Selected articles

Note: O.H.R.J : Odisha Historical Research Journal

References

External links
Orissan Archaeology, Art, Architecture, Culture, History and Religion

20th-century Indian archaeologists
Indian art historians
Historians of South Asia
Scientists from Odisha
1939 births
1989 deaths
Historians of Indian art